Wyethia is a genus of North American flowering plants in the family Asteraceae. First published by Thomas Nuttall in J. Acad. Nat. Sci. Philadelphia vol.7 on page 39 in 1834.

These plants are commonly referred to as mule's ears. They are short, low to the ground golden-rayed wildflowers that resemble miniature sunflowers. The genus is named for an early explorer of the western United States, American Nathaniel Jarvis Wyeth, 1802–1856.

Species
As accepted by Kew; and Biota of North America Program;
 Wyethia amplexicaulis  - northern mule's ears, black sunflower - WA OR ID MT NV WY UT CO 
 Wyethia angustifolia  - California compassplant, narrowleaf wyethia - WA OR CA 
 Wyethia arizonica  - Arizona mule's ears - AZ NM UT CO
 Wyethia x cusickii  - OR ID NV 
 Wyethia glabra  - Coast Range mule's ears - CA 
 Wyethia helenioides  - gray mule's ears, whitehead mule's ears - CA 
 Wyethia helianthoides  - sunflower mule's ears - OR ID NV WY MT 
 Wyethia longicaulis  - Humboldt mule's ears - CA 
 Wyethia mollis  - woolly mule's ears - CA OR NV 
 Wyethia × magna  - CO NM 
 Wyethia ovata  - California, Baja California
 Wyethia sagittata  - Oregon 

 formerly included;
Agnorhiza. Scabrethia and Vigethia

References

External links
 
 Jepson Manual Treatment
 USDA Plants Profile
 Photo gallery

 
Asteraceae genera
Flora of North America